Harry Pennington may refer to:
 Harry Pennington (wrestler) (1902–1995), British wrestler
 Harry Pennington (cricketer) (1880–1961), English cricketer
 Harry Pennington (footballer) (1873–?), English footballer